Skien Hospital is a general hospital situated in Skien, Vestfold og Telemark, Norway. It is the main facility of Telemark Hospital Trust, part of the Southern and Eastern Norway Regional Health Authority.

References

Hospitals in Norway
Buildings and structures in Skien
Telemark County Municipality
Heliports in Norway
Airports in Vestfold og Telemark